Cycle four of Suomen huippumalli haussa began airing on 12 September 2011 at 20.00 on the Finnish channel Nelonen. The winner of the competition was 20-year-old Anna-Sofia Ali-Sisto, from Oulu. As her prizes, she received a modeling contract with Paparazzi Model Management, a 6-page editorial spread in Finnish Trendi, a special casting trip to New York and the chance to become the new spokesperson for Max Factor.

Episode summaries

Episode 1
Casting episode.

Episode 2

The 12 girls arrive at the modelhouse and head straight to the photo shoot with Nigel Barker who is former judge and photographer on America's Next Top Model. Mari was the only girl who brought the energy and intensity. Minna and Eevi also excelled. Hilda and Roosa land in the bottom two; Hilda for bringing low energy on set, and Roosa for delivering a weak image. In the end, Hilda was sent home, much to the surprise for the other girls.

First call-out: Mari Viitanen
Bottom two: Hilda Nissinen & Roosa Puonti
Eliminated: Hilda Nissinen
Photographer: Nigel Barker

Episode 3

The remaining girls do an ad for Pepsodent. Mari excelled once again, giving her the best photo for a second time. Janni and Roosa land in the bottom two, Roosa for her second time. Roosa was sent home because the judges did not believe that she would make it as a top model.

First call-out: Mari Viitanen
Bottom two: Janni Puuppo & Roosa Puonti
Eliminated: Roosa Puonti

Episode 4

The remaining 10 girls have to stand out, in order to impress a rock star. Anne announces that the remaining girls (who survive elimination) are going to London. But surprisingly, Janni and Sahra are eliminated at the airport, so only 8 continue on and fly to London.

First call-out: Helen Preis
Bottom two/eliminated: Janni Puuppo & Sahra Ali Mohamud

Episode 5

The remaining 8 girls fly to London, in order to do a Vero Moda ad campaign. Eevi and Anna-Sofia were deemed best, and were allowed to participate in a two-group-shot. Although the judges found Anna-Sofia to be better in the group shot, Eevi got best picture of the week. Nelli and Veronica are the last to standing; Nelli for having an average photo this late in the competition, and Veronica for looking old and not nailing it, like the judges expected from her. Veronica was sent home, and Nelli was spared.

First call-out: Eevi Nieminen
Bottom two:  Nelli Junttila & Veronica Kontio
Eliminated: Veronica Kontio

Episode 6

The top 7 does an ad for Kalevara Jewelry. Anna-Sofia showed once again a stellar photo, earning the best photo of the week for her first time. Elsi and Mari are deemed to be the weakest, but in a shocking elimination, Mari was eliminated, and Elsi was spared.

First call-out: Anna-Sofia Ali-Sisto
Bottom two: Elsi Pulkkinen & Mari Viitanen
Eliminated: Mari Viitanen

Episode 7

In the next photo shoot, the girls have to bring different emotions, and show their versatility. Elsi went from Bottom to the top. Eevi and Nelli stand in the bottom two; Eevi for having an awkward photo, and Nelli for not giving enough. In the end, the judges felt, Eevi had more potential, and Nelli was sent home. After the elimination, Anne announces that the remaining 5 girls are going to Portugal.

First call-out: Elsi Pulkkinen
Bottom two: Eevi Nieminen & Nelli Junttila
Eliminated: Nelli Junttila

Episode 8

The final five arrives at Portugal and heads to a bikini and scarf shooting. Although Anna-Sofia won the mini challenge and gets a new job, her photo was deemed flat and being "supported". Helen, Minna and Eevi showed stellar photos while Elsi and Anna-Sofia struggled. Elsi was eliminated because her photos look flat.

First call-out: Helen Preis
Bottom two: Anna-Sofia Ali-Sisto & Elsi Pulkkinen
Eliminated: Elsi Pulkkinen

Episode 9

The final four flies back to Finland and heads to their ninth photo shoot. The judges found it hard to decide who was going home, but they found Minna, Anna-Sofia and Helen to be stronger than Eevi, so Eevi became the ninth girl to leave the competition.

First call-out: Minna Puro
Bottom two: Eevi Nieminen & Helen Preis
Eliminated: Eevi Nieminen

Episode 10

Recap Episode.

Episode 11

The final three do a black & white photo shoot. At panel, Helen was deemed to be the best out of the bunch, leaving Minna and Anna-Sofia in the bottom two. Anna-Sofia was spared again, and Minna was sent home.

First call-out: Helen Preis
Bottom two: Anna-Sofia Ali-Sisto & Minna Puro
Eliminated: Minna Puro

Episode 12

The final two do a Max Factor beauty shots and a runway show. In the end, Anna-Sofia was crowned as the fourth winner of the competition.

Final two:  Anna-Sofia Ali-Sisto & Helen Preis
Finland's Next Top Model: Anna-Sofia Ali-Sisto

Contestants

(ages stated are at start of contest)

Summaries

Call-out order

 The contestant was eliminated
 The contestant won the competition

Episode 1 was the casting episode.
In Episode 4 a trip to London was planned and both Janni and Sahra were eliminated at the airport.
Episode 10 was the recap episode.

Photo shoot guide
Episode 1 photo shoot:  Natural beauty shots (casting)
Episode 2 photo shoot:  Full body fade out shots
Episode 3 photo shoot:  Pepsodent ad with umbrellas and a male model
Episode 4 music video:  Watch Out! - Lovex
Episode 5 photo shoot:  Vero Moda fall campaign
Episode 6 photo shoot:  Kalevala jewelry on a pirate ship
Episode 7 photo shoot:  Beauty shots with LensWay glasses
Episode 8 photo shoots: Novita knit hats & Bikinis
Episode 9 photo shoot: Fashion capitals of the world
Episode 11 photo shoot: B&W simplistic shots
Episode 12 photo shoot: Max Factor beauty shots

References

External links
Nelonen homepage (in Finnish)
Nelonen homepage (in English)
Suomen huippumalli haussa homepage 

Suomen huippumalli haussa
2011 Finnish television seasons

fi:Suomen huippumalli haussa